Holy Family Catholic Church is a Roman Catholic Church located at 234 Hermitage Street in the Roxborough section of Philadelphia.

Holy Family parish

The parish of Holy Family was founded in 1885 and its boundary extends from Livezey Lane from Ridge Avenue to Valley Avenue; to air line to Wissahickon Creek; to Green Lane; to Schuylkill River; to Paoli Avenue; to Ridge Avenue; to Livezey Lane.

Parish school
A parish school is located next to the church. Children from the parish and from St. Josaphat parish attend primary grades.
The grade school now operates as a daycare center.

References

Roman Catholic churches in Philadelphia
Roman Catholic churches in Pennsylvania
History of Catholicism in the United States
1885 establishments in Pennsylvania
Roxborough, Philadelphia